Prove It is the fifth studio album by The Expendables.  The album was released on May 11, 2010, three years after their fourth studio album.

Track listing
 How Many Times - 2:28
 Get What I Need - 3:54
 Come Get High - 4:25
 Trying to Focus - 3:39
 Mr. Sun - 3:26
 Positive Mind - 3:18
 Night Mission - 4:31
 Corporate Cafeteria - 1:04
 Dance Girl Dance - 3:16
 No Higher Ground - 3:06
 Brother - 4:51
 Donkey Show - 3:58
 I Ain't Ready - 4:19
 D.C.B. - 4:59
 Mind Control - 2:55
 Wells - 5:21
 2 Inch Dub - 16:43
iTunes Edition
18. One Drop - 4:09
19. Wells (acoustic) - 4:28

Production
Aaron "El Hefe" Abeyta - Composer, Producing, Pre-Production, Mixing
Kevin LemonPre - Production
Brian "Big Bass" Gardner - Mastering
Oguer "O.G." Ocon - Percussion, Guest Appearance
Daniel Delacruz - Saxophone, Guest Appearance
Matt Vanallen - Engineer, Rainstick, Guest Appearance
Ben Moore - Engineer, Drum Technician
Favio Montes - Guitar Technician
Christofer "C-Money" Welter - Trumpet, Guest Appearance
Josh Rice - Keyboards, Guest Appearance
Shaun Logan - Art Direction
G. Love - Harmonica, Vocals, Guest Appearance
Chris DiBeneditto - Tracking
Mark Boyce - Keyboards, Guest Appearance
Chad Jenkins - Photography
Bryan Crabtree - Photography
Ryan Moran - Vibraphone, Guest Appearance
The Expendables - Composer
Garrett Dutton - Composer
Paul Leary - Producer, Mixing
Donovan Haney - Dub Effects

References

External links
Last.fm
Theexpendables.net

2010 albums